Goran Lazarevski (Macedonian: Горан Лазаревски; born 17 December 1974) is a retired Macedonian international football midfielder.

International career
He made his senior debut for Macedonia in a November 1996 friendly match away against Malta and has earned a total of 25 caps, scoring no goals. His final international was an October 2001 FIFA World Cup qualification match against Slovakia.

References

External links
 
 Profile at Srbijafudbal

1974 births
Living people
Sportspeople from Prilep
Association football midfielders
Macedonian footballers
North Macedonia international footballers
FK Pobeda players
APOEL FC players
Malatyaspor footballers
FK Vojvodina players
FK Radnički Obrenovac players
AEK Larnaca FC players
Macedonian First Football League players
Cypriot First Division players
Süper Lig players
First League of Serbia and Montenegro players
Macedonian expatriate footballers
Expatriate footballers in Cyprus
Macedonian expatriate sportspeople in Cyprus
Expatriate footballers in Turkey
Macedonian expatriate sportspeople in Turkey
Expatriate footballers in Serbia and Montenegro
Macedonian expatriate sportspeople in Serbia and Montenegro